The ruisseau Saint-Joseph (in English: Saint-Joseph stream) is a tributary on the south shore of Lake Mégantic which flows into the Chaudière River; the latter flows northward to empty on the south shore of the St. Lawrence River. The stream flows in the municipality of Saint-Augustin-de-Woburn, in the Le Granit Regional County Municipality, in the administrative region of Estrie, in Quebec, in Canada.

Toponymy 
The toponym Ruisseau Saint-Joseph was made official on October 19, 1971, at the Commission de toponymie du Québec.

See also 

 List of rivers of Quebec

References 

Rivers of Estrie
Le Granit Regional County Municipality